Hub City is an unincorporated community in Clay County, South Dakota, United States. An extremely rural community, it is not tracked by the US Census Bureau. It is located north of Vermillion and southeast of Wakonda. The NRHP-listed Anderson Homestead is located nearby.

References

Unincorporated communities in Clay County, South Dakota
Unincorporated communities in South Dakota